Heikki Hermunen (born 26 August 1964) is a Finnish former professional darts player who played in the 1990s.

Career
He played at the 1992 BDO World Darts Championship where he was defeated 3–0 by Scotsman Jamie Harvey in the first round. He also played in the Winmau World Masters the same year, losing in the first round to Mike Gregory. His best performance in the BDO, came in the 1993 Belgium Open, where he reached the final, losing to future World Champion Steve Beaton.

World Championship results

BDO
 1992: 1st Round (lost to Jamie Harvey 0–3) (sets)

External links
Profile and stats on Darts Database

Finnish darts players
Living people
1964 births
British Darts Organisation players
People from Espoo